Harold William Kaese (March 8, 1909 – May 10, 1975) was an American sports writer, best known for covering Major League Baseball in Boston, Massachusetts.

Biography
Kaese was born in 1909 in Philadelphia, grew up in Lynn, Massachusetts, and graduated from Lynn English High School where he excelled at basketball and baseball. He graduated magna cum laude from Tufts College in 1933, where he was a member of the Phi Kappa Phi fraternity. During the 1940s to 1960s, he won several squash championships at the state and national levels.

Kaese worked for the Boston Evening Transcript from 1933 to 1941, and then for The Boston Globe until 1973. He covered both the Boston Braves and the Boston Red Sox of Major League Baseball (MLB), retiring after the 1973 World Series. His writing was also published in various periodicals, including The Saturday Evening Post, The New York Times Magazine, and Sports Illustrated. He wrote a book on the history of Boston's National League team, entitled The Boston Braves, 1871–1953.

Kaese died at Massachusetts General Hospital in Boston on May 10, 1975; he had checked in to the hospital the day before, complaining of chest pains. He was survived by his wife. His funeral was attended by representatives of The Boston Globe, Boston Red Sox, Boston Bruins, and The Jimmy Fund; he was buried in Peabody, Massachusetts.

Kaese was honored (along with Red Smith) with the J. G. Taylor Spink Award by the Baseball Writers' Association of America (BBWAA) in December 1976, bestowed during  ceremonies at the National Baseball Hall of Fame and Museum in Cooperstown, New York.

References

Further reading

1909 births
1975 deaths
People from Philadelphia
Sportswriters from Massachusetts
Baseball writers
BBWAA Career Excellence Award recipients
20th-century American non-fiction writers
Tufts University alumni
The Boston Globe people